ISO 3166-2:KH is the entry for Cambodia in ISO 3166-2, part of the ISO 3166 standard published by the International Organization for Standardization (ISO), which defines codes for the names of the principal subdivisions (e.g., provinces or states) of all countries coded in ISO 3166-1.

Currently for Cambodia, ISO 3166-2 codes are defined for 1 autonomous municipality and 24 provinces.

Each code consists of two parts, separated by a hyphen. The second part is a number. The digits are currently used in postal codes, except for codes 1-9, for which one must include 0 before the number (1 becomes 01) to get the postal code from the ISO code:
 1–21: autonomous municipalities and provinces as of late 1980s
 22–25: autonomous municipalities and province created since the 1990s

Current codes
Subdivision names are listed as in the ISO 3166-2 standard published by the ISO 3166 Maintenance Agency (ISO 3166/MA).

Click on the button in the header to sort each column.

Changes
The following changes to the entry have been announced by the ISO 3166/MA since the first publication of ISO 3166-2 in 1998.  ISO stopped issuing newsletters in 2013.

See also
 Subdivisions of Cambodia
 FIPS region codes of Cambodia

External links
 ISO Online Browsing Platform: KH
 Provinces of Cambodia, Statoids.com

2:KH
ISO 3166-2
Cambodia geography-related lists